The term UN mandate is typically used to refer to a long-term international mission which has been authorized by the United Nations General Assembly or the UN Security Council in particular.  UN mandates typically involve peacekeeping operations.

Mandates in the past include Darfur, Eritrea and Libya.

External links
United Nations web site

United Nations peacekeeping